Donald L. Tucker (July 23, 1935 – September 24, 2019) was an American politician who served as the Speaker of the Florida House of Representatives and 

In 1952, Tucker attended Florida American Legion Boys State, serving as that year's program Governor. Tucker earned his Juris Doctor degree from the University of Florida in 1962.

He served as Speaker of the Florida House of Representatives from 1974 to 1978, the 49th of 58 consecutive Democrats to do so.

The Tallahassee-Leon County Civic Center, home of the Florida State University Men's and Women's basketball teams, as well as other local teams, was renamed in honor of Tucker in 1977 and is now known as the Donald L. Tucker Center.

Tucker died of cancer in 2019 at the age of 84.

References

External links

|-

|-

Ambassadors of the United States to the Dominican Republic
Members of the Florida House of Representatives
Speakers of the Florida House of Representatives
1935 births
2019 deaths
20th-century American politicians
20th-century American diplomats
People from Tallahassee, Florida
Fredric G. Levin College of Law alumni